Santiago "El Facha" Abel Hoyos (born 3 June 1982) is an Argentine retired football defender.

Career
Hoyos made his professional debut in 2000 for Lanús, he played for the club until 2004 when he joined San Lorenzo de Almagro. Hoyos did not fit into the San Lorenzo set-up, making only 6 appearances in the 2004–2005 season.

In 2005 Hoyos returned to Lanús, and in 2007 he was part of the squad that won the Apertura 2007 tournament, Lanús' first top flight league title.

In June 2011, Hoyos joined Mexican club Santos Laguna.

In January 2013, return to Argentina signed for San Martín (SJ).

Titles

External links
 Argentine Primera statistics
 Player profile on the Lanús website
 Football-Lineups player profile

1982 births
Living people
Footballers from Buenos Aires
Argentine footballers
Association football defenders
Argentine Primera División players
Liga MX players
Club Atlético Lanús footballers
San Lorenzo de Almagro footballers
Santos Laguna footballers
San Martín de San Juan footballers
All Boys footballers
Argentine expatriate footballers
Expatriate footballers in Mexico